Zver is a Slovene surname. Notable people with the surname include:

 Billy Zver (born 1987), stage name of Macedonian rapper
 Mateja Zver (born 1988), Slovenian footballer
 Milan Zver (born 1962), Slovenian politician

Slovene-language surnames